Praha-Veleslavín railway station is located in Veleslavín, Prague 6, on line 120, linking Prague's Masarykovo nádraží with Kladno and Rakovník.

Freight services through this station were discontinued entirely since the 2008 closing of the spur to the nearby heating plant. The station is located a short distance from a tram stop on Evropská třída, which is also connected to Line A of the Prague Metro following completion of the current extension from Dejvická to Motol in 2015. The planned express line from Masarykovo to Ruzyně Airport will pass through Veleslavín, and increase the frequency of trains on the Prague-Kladno line to 4tph (trains per hour) in each direction, compared to today's 1tph.

References

External links 

 Info page

Veleslavin
Railway stations opened in 1863